Hoseynabad-e Ruintan (also Romanized as Ḩoseynābād-e Rū'īntan; also known as Ḩasanābād) is a village in Sar Firuzabad Rural District, Firuzabad District, Kermanshah County, Kermanshah Province, Iran. At the 2006 census, its population was 56, in 14 families.

References 

Populated places in Kermanshah County